Svanholm Park is a cricket ground in Brøndby, Denmark.  The ground was constructed following the need for Svanholm Cricket Klub to move from their ground next to the Brøndby Stadium due to Brøndby IF needing to build a new stand which would have encroached on the ground.  Svanholm Park was constructed by 1999 and contains three cricket grounds. The grounds overlap one another, so when the centre ground is in use, neither of the grounds flanking it can be used.  The grounds facilities also include a purpose built pavilion and indoor practice facilities.

Th ground first saw action when Denmark played Pakistan Emerging Players in 1999.  Later, a single List A match was held there in the 2005 Cheltenham & Gloucester Trophy when Denmark played Northamptonshire.  Denmark suffered a heavy defeat in this match.  Batting first, they were dismissed for just 56, with Northamptonshire's Charl Pietersen taking figures of 7/10 from 8 overs.  In reply, Northamptonshire knocked off the winning runs with just two wickets lost. This was the first major men's match to be played in Denmark.

The national teams of the Netherlands, Bermuda, Finland and Norway have also played international matches at the ground. The ground hosted official Twenty20 International matches for the first time in July 2019, when Finland toured for a two-match series, which Denmark won 2–0.

References

External links
Svanholm Park, Brøndby at CricketArchive

Cricket grounds in Denmark
Buildings and structures in Brøndby Municipality
1999 establishments in Denmark
Sports venues completed in 1999